Terence James McQuade (born 24 February 1941) is an English footballer who played as an outside left in the Football League.

References

External links
League stats at Neil Brown's site

1941 births
Living people
English footballers
People from Holborn
Enfield F.C. players
Millwall F.C. players
Queens Park Rangers F.C. players
Charlton Athletic F.C. players
Dover F.C. players
Corby Town F.C. players
Addington F.C. players
Durban City F.C. players
English Football League players
Association football outside forwards